Margaret Seddon (November 18, 1872 – April 17, 1968) was an American stage and film actress.

Biography
She appeared in more than 100 films between 1915 and 1951. Her most memorable role was perhaps as one of The Pixilated Sisters, a comedic stage act with actress Margaret McWade. In 1936, they reprised their roles in the film Mr Deeds Goes to Town. On Broadway, Seddon performed in Modern Marriage (1911) and The Things That Count (1913). She was born in Washington, D.C., and died in Philadelphia, Pennsylvania.

Selected filmography

 The Dawn of a Tomorrow (1915) - Polly
 The Old Homestead (1915) - Rickety Ann
 Miss Robinson Crusoe (1917) - Aunt Eloise
 The Girl Without A Soul (1917) - Henrietta Hateman
 The Land of Promise (1917) - Miss Pringle
 The Unveiling Hand (1919) - Mrs. Bellamy
 The Country Cousin (1919) - Mrs. Howitt
 The Miracle of Money (1920) - Patricia Hodges
 Wings of Pride (1920) - Mrs. Prentice
 Headin' Home (1920) - Babe's Mother
 The Inside of the Cup (1921) - Mrs. Garvin
 The Highest Law (1921) - Mrs. Goodwin
 The Man Worth While (1921) - Mrs. Ward
 The Case of Becky (1921) - Mrs. Emerson
 The Blasphemer (1921) - Mrs. Harden - John's Mother
 Just Around the Corner (1921) - Ma Birdsong
 A Man's Home (1921) - Amanda Green
 School Days (1921) - His Teacher
 Boomerang Bill (1922) - Annie's Mother
 Sonny (1922) - Mrs. Crosby
 Timothy's Quest (1922) - Samantha Ann Ripley
 The Man Who Played God (1922) - Old Woman
 The Lights of New York (1922) - Mrs. Reid
 Women Men Marry (1922) - Hetty Page
 Brass (1923) - Mrs. Baldwin
 Little Church Around the Corner (1923) - Mrs. Wallace
 The Bright Shawl (1923) - Carmencita Escobar
 Little Johnny Jones (1923) - Mrs. Jones
 The Gold Diggers (1923) - Mrs. La Mar
 Through the Dark (1924) - Mother McGinn
 A Lady of Quality (1924) - Lady Daphne Wildairs
 The Human Terror (1924)
 Women Who Give (1924) - Ma Keeler
 The Night Message (1924) - Mrs. Longstreet
 The Confidence Man (1924) - Mrs. X
 The Snob (1924) - Mrs. Curry
 The Lady (1925) - Mrs. Cairns
 New Lives for Old (1925) - Widow Turrene
 On the Threshold (1925) - Martha McKay
 A Broadway Butterfly (1925) - Mrs. Steel
 Proud Flesh (1925) - Mrs. O'Malley
 The Midshipman (1925) - Mrs. Randall
 Wages for Wives (1925) - Annie Bailey
 The Golden Cocoon (1925) - Mrs. Shannon
 Wild Oats Lane (1926) - The Mother
 Things Wives Tell (1926)
 Rolling Home (1926) - Mrs. Alden
 Blarney (1926) - Peggy's Aunt
 The Nickel-Hopper (1926, Short) - Paddy's Mother
 A Regular Scout (1926) - Mrs. Monroe
 Driven from Home (1927)
 Matinee Ladies (1927) - Mrs. Smith
 White Pants Willie (1927) - Winifred Barnes
 Quality Street (1927) - Nancy Willoughby
 Home Made (1927) - Mrs. White
 Silk Legs (1927) - Mrs. Fulton
 Gentlemen Prefer Blondes (1928) - Lorelei's Mother
 The Actress (1928) - Miss Trafalgar Gower
 The Bellamy Trial (1929) - Mother Ives
 She Goes to War (1929) - Tom's Mother
 Dance Hall (1929) - Mrs. Flynn
 After the Fog (1929) - Letitia Barker
 The Dude Wrangler (1930) - Aunt Mary
 Dancing Sweeties (1930) - Mrs. Cleaver
 Divorce Among Friends (1930) - Maid
 Smilin' Through (1932) - Ellen
 If I Had a Million (1932) - Mrs. Small - Idylwood Resident (uncredited)
 Bachelor Mother (1932) - Cynthia Wilson
 Broadway Bad (1933) - Bixby (uncredited)
 Lilly Turner (1933) - Mrs. Turner
 The Return of Casey Jones (1933) - Mrs. Mary Martin
 Heroes for Sale (1933) - Jeanette Holmes
 Midshipman Jack (1933) - Mrs. Burns
 Walls of Gold (1933) - Mrs. Satterlee
 The Worst Woman in Paris? (1933) - Mrs. John Strong
 Shock (1934) - Housekeeper (uncredited)
 Babes in Toyland (1934) - Widow Piper (uncredited)
 David Copperfield (1935) - Dora's Aunt (uncredited)
 The Flame Within (1935) - Mrs. Ida Grenfell
 Two Sinners (1935) - Mrs. Summerstone
 The Girl Friend (1935) - Grandma Henry
 It's in the Air (1935) - Mrs. Martha (uncredited)
 Mr. Deeds Goes to Town (1936) - Jane Faulkner (uncredited)
 The Big Game (1936) - Mother Jenkins (uncredited)
 A Woman Rebels (1936) - Serena (uncredited)
 Let's Make a Million (1936) - Aunt Martha
 College Holiday (1936) - Mrs. Schloggenheimer
 The Road Back (1937) - Mother (uncredited)
 Danger - Love at Work (1937) - Aunt Pitty
 Breakfast for Two (1937) - Stockholder (uncredited)
 Having Wonderful Time (1938) - Mrs. G (scenes deleted)
 Raffles (1939) - Maud Holden
 The Hunchback of Notre Dame (1939) - Older Sister (uncredited)
 Dr. Kildare's Strange Case (1940) - Mrs. Julia Cray, Skin Allergy Patient
 Strike Up the Band (1940) - Old Lady (scenes deleted)
 Friendly Neighbors (1940) - Martha Williams
 The Bank Dick (1940) - Old Lady in Car (uncredited)
 Dr. Kildare's Wedding Day (1941) - Mrs. Bartlett
 Roxie Hart (1942) - Mrs. Wadsworth (uncredited)
 The Remarkable Andrew (1942) - Mrs. Kelly (uncredited)
 The Wife Takes a Flyer (1942) - The Twin
 Take a Letter, Darling (1942) - Aunt Judy
 Scattergood Survives a Murder (1942) - Cynthia Quentin
 The Meanest Man in the World (1943) - Mrs. Frances H. Leggitt
 Sherlock Holmes in Washington (1943) - Miss Pringle (uncredited)
 Honeymoon Lodge (1943) - Elderly Woman (uncredited)
 I Dood It (1943) - Woman Sitting Next to Joseph (uncredited)
 House by the River (1950) - Mrs. Whittaker - Party Guest
 Three Desperate Men (1951) - Mrs. Denton

References

External links

1872 births
1968 deaths
American stage actresses
American film actresses
American silent film actresses
20th-century American actresses
Actresses from Washington, D.C.